David Hollander (born May 16, 1968) is an American television writer, director, and producer from Pittsburgh, Pennsylvania.

Career
Hollander is the creator, screenwriter, and an executive producer of The Guardian, a Pittsburgh-based legal drama. The series stars Simon Baker and aired on CBS from September 2001 until May 2004.

He also created the TNT series Heartland in 2007 and has been the show runner of the Showtime series Ray Donovan since 2014. He was nominated for an Emmy for directing the episode "Exsuscito".

Hollander also directed the 2008 film Personal Effects, starring Michelle Pfeiffer, Ashton Kutcher and Kathy Bates.

He also served on the faculty of the USC Screenwriting Master's Program from 1995 to 2000.

In 2020, after the 7th season, Showtime abruptly ended the drama series Ray Donovan. Later that year, it was announced that a film of the same name would be produced to serve as a conclusion to the series. The film is directed by Hollander and written by himself and lead actor of the series, Liev Schreiber. It premiered on January 14, 2022.

Education 
He is an alumnus of Northwestern University in Chicago.

See also
 The Guardian
 Heartland
 Ray Donovan

References

External links

 Regarding Personal Effects script, with Hollander's picture
Article from the Pittsburgh Post-Gazette regarding Heartland
producer biography for The Guardian at Sony Pictures (2002)
 
 

Living people
1968 births
American television writers
Television producers from Pennsylvania
American male screenwriters
American male writers
Businesspeople from Pittsburgh
Northwestern University School of Communication alumni
American male television writers
Screenwriters from Pennsylvania
Film producers from Pennsylvania
Sewickley Academy alumni